Stemonitis fusca is a species of slime mold. It fruits in clusters on dead wood and has distinctive tall brown sporangia supported on slender stalks with a total height of approximately 6–20 mm tall.

Subspecies
Stemonitis fusca var. rufescens, Lister 1894

References

Further reading

External links

 Images of Stemonitis fusca

Myxogastria
Species described in 1787